In mathematics, particularly linear algebra, the Schur–Horn theorem, named after Issai Schur and Alfred Horn, characterizes the diagonal of a Hermitian matrix with given eigenvalues. It has inspired investigations and substantial generalizations in the setting of symplectic geometry. A few important generalizations are Kostant's convexity theorem, Atiyah–Guillemin–Sternberg convexity theorem, Kirwan convexity theorem.

Statement

The inequalities above may alternatively be written:

The Schur–Horn theorem may thus be restated more succinctly and in plain English:

Schur–Horn theorem: Given any non-increasing real sequences of desired diagonal elements  and desired eigenvalues  there exists a Hermitian matrix with these eigenvalues and diagonal elements if and only if these two sequences have the same sum and for every possible integer  the sum of the first  desired diagonal elements never exceeds the sum of the first  desired eigenvalues.

Reformation allowing unordered diagonals and eigenvalues

Although this theorem requires that  and  be non-increasing, it is possible to reformulate this theorem without these assumptions. 

We start with the assumption  
The left hand side of the theorem's characterization (that is, "there exists a Hermitian matrix with these eigenvalues and diagonal elements") depends on the order of the desired diagonal elements  (because changing their order would change the Hermitian matrix whose existence is in question) but it does  depend on the order of the desired eigenvalues  

On the right hand right hand side of the characterization, only the values of  depend on the assumption  
Notice that this assumption means that the expression  is just notation for the sum of the  largest desired eigenvalues. 
Replacing the expression  with this written equivalent makes the assumption  completely unnecessary:

Schur–Horn theorem: Given any  desired real eigenvalues and a non-increasing real sequence of desired diagonal elements  there exists a Hermitian matrix with these eigenvalues and diagonal elements if and only if these two sequences have the same sum and for every possible integer  the sum of the first  desired diagonal elements never exceeds the sum of the   desired eigenvalues.

Permutation polytope generated by a vector

The following lemma characterizes the permutation polytope of a vector in

Reformulation of Schur–Horn theorem

In view of the equivalence of (i) and (ii) in the lemma mentioned above, one may reformulate the theorem in the following manner.

Theorem. Let  and  be real numbers. There is a Hermitian matrix with diagonal entries  and eigenvalues  if and only if the vector  is in the permutation polytope generated by 

Note that in this formulation, one does not need to impose any ordering on the entries of the vectors  and

Proof of the Schur–Horn theorem

Let  be a  Hermitian matrix with eigenvalues  counted with multiplicity.

()  may be written in the form  where  is a unitary matrix. Then

Let  be the matrix defined by  Since  is a unitary matrix,  is a doubly stochastic matrix and we have  By the Birkhoff–von Neumann theorem,  can be written as a convex combination of permutation matrices. Thus  is in the permutation polytope generated by  This proves Schur's theorem.

() If  occurs as the diagonal of a Hermitian matrix with eigenvalues  then  also occurs as the diagonal of some Hermitian matrix with the same set of eigenvalues, for any transposition  in  One may prove that in the following manner.

Then 

 is a Hermitian matrix with eigenvalues  Using the equivalence of (i) and (iii) in the lemma mentioned above, we see that any vector in the permutation polytope generated by  occurs as the diagonal of a Hermitian matrix with the prescribed eigenvalues. This proves Horn's theorem.

Symplectic geometry perspective

The Schur–Horn theorem may be viewed as a corollary of the Atiyah–Guillemin–Sternberg convexity theorem in the following manner. Let  denote the group of  unitary matrices. Under these actions,  is an -equivariant map i.e. for every  the following diagram commutes,

Let  and  denote the diagonal matrix with entries given by  Let  denote the orbit of  under the -action i.e. conjugation. Under the -equivariant isomorphism  the symplectic structure on the corresponding coadjoint orbit may be brought onto  Thus  is a Hamiltonian -manifold.

By the Atiyah–Guillemin–Sternberg theorem,  is a convex polytope. A matrix  is fixed under conjugation by every element of  if and only if  is diagonal. Thus, these matrices generate the convex polytope  This is exactly the statement of the Schur–Horn theorem.

Notes

References

 Schur, Issai, Über eine Klasse von Mittelbildungen mit Anwendungen auf die Determinantentheorie, Sitzungsber. Berl. Math. Ges. 22 (1923), 9–20.
 Horn, Alfred, Doubly stochastic matrices and the diagonal of a rotation matrix, American Journal of Mathematics 76 (1954), 620–630.
 Kadison, R. V.; Pedersen, G. K., Means and Convex Combinations of Unitary Operators, Math. Scand. 57 (1985),249–266.
 Kadison, R. V., The Pythagorean Theorem: I. The finite case, Proc. Natl. Acad. Sci. USA, vol. 99 no. 7 (2002):4178–4184 (electronic)

External links

 MathWorld
 Terry Tao: 254A, Notes 3a: Eigenvalues and sums of Hermitian matrices
 Sheela Devadas, Peter J. Haine, Keaton Stubis: The Schur-Horn Theorem

Order theory
Theorems in linear algebra
Matrix theory
Spectral theory